Agassiz station is a railway station in Agassiz, British Columbia, Canada, located along CPR's Cascade subdivision. The station is served by Via Rail's The Canadian as a flag stop (48 hours advance notice required).

The station is only served by eastbound trains towards Toronto. Westbound trains call at Chilliwack railway station along the CN Railway tracks, on the other side of the Fraser River. This split in service between Vancouver and Ashcroft is due to CN and CPR utilizing directional running through the Thompson- and Fraser Canyon.

References

Via Rail stations in British Columbia